Jabłonna Lacka  is a village in Sokołów County, Masovian Voivodeship, in east-central Poland. It is the seat of the gmina (administrative district) called Gmina Jabłonna Lacka.

The village has an approximate population of 1,500.

External links
 Jewish Community in Jabłonna Lacka on Virtual Shtetl

References

Villages in Sokołów County